Armenian victims of the Great Purge included Armenian intellectuals, writers, artists, Bolshevik and later Soviet statesmen, military commanders, and religious figures. Orchestrated by Joseph Stalin, the Great Purge was a campaign of political repression and persecution in the Soviet Union against supposed "enemies of the people," including members of the Communist Party, the peasantry, writers and intellectuals, and other unaffiliated persons. The worst period, under NKVD head Nikolay Yezhov, was known as the Yezhovschina ('period of Yezhov'). In the years from 1936 to 1938, thousands of people suffered from Stalinist repressions in Soviet Armenia.

Background
The process of the Great Purge in Armenia is usually dated to 9 July 1936, with the assassination of Armenian First Secretary Aghasi Khanjian by Lavrentiy Beria in Tiflis (Tbilisi). The death was the result of a political struggle between Beria and Khanjian. At first, Beria framed Khanjian's death as "suicide," but soon condemned him for abetting "rabid nationalist elements." After Khanjian's death, Beria promoted his loyalists in Armenia, Amatuni Amatuni as Armenian First Secretary and Khachik Mughdusi as chief of the Armenian NKVD. Under the command of Beria's allies, the campaign against "enemies" intensified. Expressions of "nationalism" were suspect and many leading Armenian writers, artists, scientists, and intellectuals were executed or imprisoned, including Axel Bakunts, Yeghishe Charents, Gurgen Mahari, Nersik Stepanyan, and others. According to Amatuni in a June 1937 letter to Stalin, 1,365 people were arrested in the ten months after the death of Khanjian, among them 900 "Dashnak-Trotskyists."

The arrest and death of Sahak Ter-Gabrielyan in August 1937 was a turning point in the repressions. When being interrogated by Mughdusi, Ter-Gabrielyan "either jumped or was thrown from" the window of the NKVD building in Yerevan. Stalin was angered that Mughdusi and Amatuni neglected to inform him about the incident. In response, in September 1937, he sent Georgy Malenkov, Mikhail Litvin, and later Anastas Mikoyan to oversee a purge of the Communist Party of Armenia. During his trip to Armenia, Mikoyan tried, but failed, to save one individual (Daniel "Danush" Shahverdyan) from being executed. More than a thousand people were arrested and seven of nine members of the Armenian Politburo were sacked from office. The trip also resulted in the appointment of a new Armenian Party leadership, headed by Grigory Arutinov, who was approved by Beria.

The Armenian Apostolic Church was not spared from the repressions. Soviet attacks against the Church under Stalin were known since 1929, but momentarily eased to improve the Soviet Union's relations with the Armenian diaspora. In 1932, Khoren I became Catholicos of All Armenians and assumed the leadership of the church. However, in the late 1930s, the Armenian NKVD, led by Mughdusi and his successor, Viktor Khvorostyan, renewed the attacks against the Church. These attacks culminated in the 1938 murder of Khoren and the closing of the Catholicate of Etchmiadzin, an act for which Beria is usually held responsible. However, the Church survived and was later revived when Stalin eased restrictions on religion at the end of World War II. In addition to the repression of the Church, thousands of Armenians were forcibly exiled to the Altai Krai in 1949. Many were repatriated Armenians who arrived from the Armenian diaspora.

After Stalin's death, Anastas Mikoyan called for the rehabilitation of Charents in a speech in Yerevan on 11 March 1954, beginning de-Stalinization and the Thaw in Armenia.

List
Below is the incomplete list of Great Purge victims from the Armenian SSR, or victims of Stalinism of ethnic Armenian origin.

References

Bibliography

Political and cultural purges